Robert Eugene Bledsaw (May 18, 1942 – April 19, 2008) was the founder of the role-playing game publisher Judges Guild.

Early life and education
Bob Bledsaw was born May 18, 1942, in Decatur, Illinois, and was the son of Walter and Dorothy Bledsaw. He graduated from Lakeview High School and Richland Community College and attended Millikin University. He was employed as an engineer by A.W. Cash, Grigoleit, Essex Wire, General Electric and Zexel Illinois, contributing to the development of quadraphonic sound systems.

Career
In 1975, Bob Bledsaw began to run a campaign using the original Dungeons & Dragons rules, after being asked for help by Bill Owen and a group of other friends who had unsuccessfully tried to run the game four times; he started his adventure in a fantasy campaign set in Middle-earth, but moved the campaign to a realm of his own design - the City State of the Invincible Overlord - rather than sacrifice the integrity of Tolkien's world. When Bledsaw was laid off from his job at General Electric in 1975, he decided to form a company to create supplements for D&D players, and with Bill Owen he went to seek permission from TSR. Bledsaw and Owen showed their City-State material to Dave Arneson, Gary Gygax, and other TSR staff, who told them they could publish supplements to D&D if they wanted to. With this casual licensing agreement, they created a large map of Bledsaw's City-State, first selling copies of the map and subscriptions to Judges Guild's bimonthly play aids publication. In 1976, with partner Bill Owen he founded The Judges Guild Game Co., which manufactured role-playing games and supplies.

Bledsaw and Owen became full-time employees of Judges Guild in 1977; Owen was also working full-time for his family business, so he left Judges Guild in the fall of 1977 and sold his shares to Bledsaw. By spring of 1978, Judges Guild left Bledsaw's living room and moved to a real office. Bledsaw hoped to use his connection with Chuck Anshell - who was friends with one of J.R.R. Tolkien's sons - to acquire a license to Middle-earth, but waited too long out of respect for Tolkien's passing in 1973, and thus Iron Crown Enterprises got the license instead. In 1978 Bledsaw sent Gary Gygax hundreds of pages of notes about campaigns, some of which was incorporated into the original Dungeon Masters Guide as appendices. When TSR started publishing their own adventures in 1978 beginning with the G-series, the D-series, and Tomb of Horrors, Bledsaw felt this was in violation of TSR's previous agreement with Judges Guild. By 1985, Judges Guild had stopped publishing new material after several distributors and retailers went out of business owing Judges Guild money.

Early in 1999, Judges Guild - led by Bob Bledsaw - returned on the internet at judgesguild.com, and began selling original Judges Guild products which had been warehoused for 15 years, and also started taking new subscriptions for Pegasus magazine. Bledsaw and James Mishler formed a new company called Adventure Games Publishing.

Bob Bledsaw died on April 19, 2008, from cancer. Bob Bledsaw II took over Judges Guild, which published Lost Man's Trail (2010) as Bob Bledsaw's final contribution to the world of the Wilderlands.

References

External links
 Bob Bledsaw's obituary
 

1942 births
2008 deaths
American game designers
Millikin University alumni
People from Decatur, Illinois